Silvano Raggio Garibaldi (born 27 April 1989) is an Italian footballer who plays as a midfielder. Born in Chiavari, he has represented Italy at Under-18, Under-19 and Under-20 levels.

Club career
Raggio Garibaldi made his Serie A debut on 14 April 2008 in a 3–0 home win for his side against Torino.

He spent the 2008–09 season on loan to Serie B side Pisa. He then spent three consecutive seasons on loan, first to Sorrento of Lega Pro Prima Divisione and then for two consecutive seasons to Gubbio (the first in Lega Pro Prima Divisione, the second in Serie B). In July 2012 he was reacquired by hometown club Virtus Entella, where he had been already as a youth player; his stint with the Chiavari-based club was already marred by injuries, as he struggled to gain a regular first team place.

On 3 November 2018, he signed with Serie D club Como. On 20 June 2019, following Como's promotion to Serie C, he signed a new 2-year contract with the club.

On 9 October 2020 he joined Foggia.

On 5 August 2021 he signed with Seregno.

References

External links

1989 births
Living people
People from Chiavari
Footballers from Liguria
Italian footballers
Association football midfielders
Serie A players
Serie B players
Serie C players
Serie D players
Genoa C.F.C. players
Pisa S.C. players
A.S.D. Sorrento players
A.S. Gubbio 1910 players
Virtus Entella players
Mantova 1911 players
U.S.D. Lavagnese 1919 players
Como 1907 players
Calcio Foggia 1920 players
U.S. 1913 Seregno Calcio players
Italy youth international footballers
Mediterranean Games silver medalists for Italy
Mediterranean Games medalists in football
Competitors at the 2009 Mediterranean Games